Alberto Diamante (born in 1970) is an Italian-Canadian screenwriter, film director, photographer, actor, certified Italian interpreter and film editor.

He has written and directed three feature films, "Ulysses," "Love… and Other Reasons to Panic" and "The Bookstore." The latter was presented at the 2016 Italian Contemporary Film Festival. He has also starred in "Ulysses" and "The Bookstore." He edited "Love…and other reasons to panic."

Diamante graduated from York University with a degree in English and Film. He went on to direct a few short films before venturing into features.

His screenplay, Skin, was a finalist at several international screenwriting competitions, including in London and New York City.

He is a fully accredited Italian court interpreter and has interpreted for many Italian filmmakers at the Toronto International Film Festival, including Nanni Moretti, Gabriele Salvatores, Roberto Benigni, Carlo Verdone, Paolo Sorrentino and many others.

He speaks Italian, English and French.

References

1970 births
Italian screenwriters
Italian film directors
Italian photographers
20th-century Italian male actors
21st-century Italian male actors
Living people
York University alumni
Place of birth missing (living people)
Italian male screenwriters